Willem Maduro is a judoka who represented the Netherlands Antilles. He competed in the men's half-heavyweight event at the 1976 Summer Olympics.

References

Year of birth missing (living people)
Living people
Dutch Antillean male judoka
Olympic judoka of the Netherlands Antilles
Judoka at the 1976 Summer Olympics
Place of birth missing (living people)